Gheni Batur (Cyrillic Uyghur: Ғени Батур; 190229 June 1981) is a Uyghur national hero who was among the first 20 horsemen who began uprising in Nilka County of Ili valley of Sinkiang in September 1944 against Kuomintang Sinkiang provincial government, which eventually led to the establishment of Second East Turkestan Republic in northern Sinkiang (Jungaria).
After the establishment of the People's Republic of China, he fled to the Soviet Union. He lies buried in Almaty, Kazakhstan.

Bibliography

Zordun Sabir, Anayurt, Almaty: Nash Mir (2006)
Ziya Samedi, Gheni the Brave, Ghéni Batur (1902–1981)

1902 births
1981 deaths
Chinese emigrants to the Soviet Union
People from Xinjiang
Uyghurs
Ili National Army